The Yeşilırmak ( 'Green River'; classical , Iris) is a river in northern Turkey. From its source northeast of Sivas, it flows past Tokat and Amasya, crosses the Pontic Mountains and the Çarşamba Plain, reaching the Black Sea east of Samsun after .

Its tributaries include the Çekerek (ancient Scylax) and the Kelkit (ancient Lycus).

It was mentioned by Menippus of Pergamon in the 1st century BC.

Strabo's Geographica describes it as flowing through Comana Pontica, the plain of Dazimonitis (Kaşova), and Gaziura (probably modern Turhal) before receiving the waters of the Scylax, then flowing through Amaseia (Amasya) before reaching the valley of Phanaroea.

Starting with Dionysius Periegetes, in his Periegesis of the World, the Iris is often confused with the Thermodon (modern Terme), which also crosses the Themiscyra Plain (modern Çarşamba Plain), with its mouth about 40 km further east; the Thermodon is much smaller and clearer.

Notes

Rivers of Turkey
Black Sea Region
Landforms of Sivas Province
Landforms of Tokat Province
Landforms of Amasya Province
Landforms of Samsun Province